Prebuild is a compilation album by English electronic music group 808 State, which was released on 4 October 2004 by Rephlex Records. It contains tracks recorded during the Newbuild recording sessions in 1987 and 1988.

Original track listing 
 "Automatic" – 10:36
 "Ride" – 5:09
 "Johnnycab" – 5:59
 "Massage-a-rama" – 5:18
 "Clonezone" – 3:34
 "CosaCosa" – 4:06
 "Sex Mechanic" – 6:55
 "C.I.S." – 3:19
 "K Narcossa" – 3:27
 "Thermo Kings" – 14:28

References

2004 albums
808 State albums
ZTT Records albums